Courts of Oregon include:
;State courts of Oregon

Oregon Supreme Court
Oregon Court of Appeals
Oregon Circuit Courts (36 courts, one for each county, administratively divided between 27 judicial districts)
Oregon Justice Courts
Oregon Municipal Courts
Oregon County Courts
Oregon Tax Court

Federal courts located in Oregon
United States District Court for the District of Oregon

References

External links
National Center for State Courts – directory of state court websites.

Courts in the United States